Willow Creek is a tributary, about  long, of the Deschutes River in central Oregon in the United States. Arising near Foley Butte in the western Ochoco Mountains in Crook County, it flows generally northwest into Jefferson County and through the Crooked River National Grassland. The creek continues through the city of Madras and becomes the dividing line between two plateaus, Agency Plains and Little Agency Plains.

Named tributaries from source to mouth are Higgins, Coon, Newbill, and McMeen creeks followed by Dry Canyon. The creek and its tributaries support populations of redband trout, largescale sucker, bridgelip sucker, and longnose dace.

See also 
 List of Oregon rivers

References

External links

Rivers of Crook County, Oregon
Rivers of Jefferson County, Oregon
Rivers of Oregon
Madras, Oregon